Anne Frances Ashworth (1842 – 1921) was a British feminist activist.

Ashworth grew up in a Quaker family in Bath, Somerset.  Her father, Thomas Ashworth, was a friend of Richard Cobden, while Jacob Bright and John Bright were her uncles, all liberals with an interest in feminism.  Together with her sister, Lilias, Anne signed the 1866 petition for women's suffrage.  A founder member of the London National Society for Women's Suffrage, on the request of Clementia Taylor, Anne and Lilias formed a Bath branch of the group.  Anne served on its executive committee, and when the Central Committee of the National Society for Women's Suffrage was set up in 1872, Anne also sat on its executive.

In 1871, the first elections were held to the Bath School Board, and Ashworth was elected, one of only seven women around the country to win a seat at the initial elections.  From 1873, she sat on the executive of the Married Women's Property Committee, and she also held membership of the Edinburgh National Society for Women's Suffrage and the Bristol and West of England Society.  She did not address meetings, but supported the groups organisationally, financially, and by providing her home, Claverton Lodge, for speakers to rest after they had completed a tour.

Ashworth married Joseph Cross, brother of Liberal MP John Kynaston Cross, in 1877.  They moved to Cross' house in Bolton, and Ashworth joined the Manchester Society for Women's Suffrage, serving on its executive, remaining a vice-president of the group as late as 1907.

References

1842 births
1921 deaths
English feminists
English Quakers
English suffragists
People from Bath, Somerset
Quaker feminists